Roswitha Fischer was an Italian luger who competed in the late 1970s and early 1980s. A natural track luger, she won two bronze medals in the women's singles event at the FIL World Luge Natural Track Championships (1979, 1980).

Fischer also won two medals at the FIL European Luge Natural Track Championships with a gold in 1979 and a silver in 1978.

References

External links
Natural track World Championships results: 1979-2007

Italian lugers
Italian female lugers
Possibly living people
Year of birth missing
Sportspeople from Südtirol